Bikas or Bikás may refer to
Bikas (surname)
Bikás park, a metro station in Budapest, Hungary
Nepal Rastriya Bikas Party, a political party in Nepal
Rastriya Bikas Party, a political party in Nepal
Rastriya Jana Bikas Party, a political party in Nepal

See also
Bika (disambiguation)